Le nozze di Teti e di Peleo may refer to:

 Le nozze di Teti e di Peleo (1639), an opera by the baroque composer Francesco Cavalli
 Le nozze di Peleo e di Theti (1654), an opera by Carlo Caproli
 Le nozze di Teti e di Peleo, a cantata by the belcanto composer Gioachino Rossini